Top Cow Productions is an American comics publisher, an imprint of Image Comics founded by Marc Silvestri in 1992.

History

During the early years of Image Comics, founded in 1992, Marc Silvestri the founder, shared a studio with Jim Lee, where he created his first creator-owned comic book, Cyberforce, as part of Image's initial line-up. After setting up his own studio, Top Cow Productions, he expanded into other comics, launching Codename: Strykeforce, a new Cyberforce series and various spin-offs.

The company attracted several professionals including artist Brandon Peterson, writer Garth Ennis and former Marvel staffer David Wohl. It also helped launch the careers of various writers and artists, such as Christina Z., Joe Benitez, Michael Turner and David Finch. Benitez, Turner and Finch have since worked for DC and Marvel Comics.

In 1996, Top Cow briefly departed from Image during a power struggle with Image associate Rob Liefeld until Liefeld left the company shortly after. At the same time, Top Cow was moving more into the fantasy genre. New properties were Witchblade (where Turner had his first big success) and The Darkness (where Marc Silvestri returned to artist duties). Thanks to the success of Witchblade, Top Cow was able to expand, adding to its line with titles that included The Darkness, Magdalena, Aphrodite IX, and others. Silvestri was heavily involved in training and developing new talent through the studio and Top Cow was known for a time for its "house style."

In addition to its company-owned properties, Top Cow has worked with creators to develop creator-owned properties. These properties have included Michael Turner's Fathom which eventually ended up at Aspen Comics, and Joe's Comics, created exclusively for J. Michael Straczynski, which included Rising Stars and Midnight Nation. Top Cow is also known for bringing Tomb Raider'''s Lara Croft to comics.

In 2006, Top Cow made a business agreement with Marvel Comics to use several of their licensed properties in their own series, with characters including Wolverine and the Punisher, appearing in crossovers (Darkness/Wolverine and Witchblade/Punisher). Also, as part of this agreement, several Top Cow artists provided art chores on various Marvel series, such as Tyler Kirkham (Phoenix: Warsong and New Avengers/Transformers), Mike Choi (X-23: Target X), and Silvestri himself (X-Men: Messiah Complex). At the 2007 San Diego Comic Con, an announcement was made by Marvel Comics extending the deal into 2008. They also used Kickstarter to fund some of the comics.

At the 2007 New York Comic Con it was announced that Top Cow would be one of the first major comics publishers to offer online distribution, through a partnership with IGN. The initial titles offered were Tomb Raider #1–50, The Darkness #1–50 and Witchblade #1–50, at around $1 per issue. They also announced a deal with Zannel to license their comics as mobile comics.

Titles

Media adaptations
Top Cow publisher Filip Sablik said in an interview that: 

The Darkness

Film
In December 2004, Dimension Films paid an undisclosed six-figure sum to develop a movie based on the comic, possibly for release in 2008. The film was pitched as a movie similar to The Crow, which was also produced by Dimension. There have been no further developments.

Video games
In March 2005, The Darkness was licensed by Majesco Entertainment for a console game to be developed by Starbreeze Studios. 2K Games later obtained the rights to the game, and the first-person shooter was released for the Xbox 360 and PlayStation 3 console systems on June 25, 2007 in the United States and releasing first on Xbox 360 in EU Regions on June 29, 2007 and then a month later on PS3 on July 20.

To promote the video game, a five-issue mini-series was released, with each issue chronicled a chapter of the game. In June 2007, it was collected into a trade paperback.

In February 2012, a sequel to the video game, entitled The Darkness II, was released for PC, Xbox 360 and PlayStation 3. The script for the game was written by comic book writer Paul Jenkins, who previously worked on The Darkness comic series. Unlike the first game, the graphics for The Darkness II were developed using a cel-shading technique, emulating the aesthetic of its graphic novel namesake. The game received positive reviews from critics.

Witchblade

Television series

Following a pilot film in August 2000, the cable network TNT premiered a television series based on the comic book series in 2001. The series was directed by Ralph Hemecker and written by Marc Silvestri and J.D. Zeik. Yancy Butler starred as Sara Pezzini. Although critically acclaimed and popular with audiences, it was canceled in September 2002. Announced as a production decision, the cancellation nevertheless provoked widespread speculation that the true reason was Butler's alcohol addiction. Butler was ordered to enter rehab for alcohol addiction a year later, after being arrested for wandering intoxicated amidst traffic.Witchblade ran for two seasons of 12 episodes on TNT. The first episode aired on June 12, 2001, and the last episode aired on August 26, 2002. On April 1, 2008, Warner Home Video announced a long-anticipated DVD release. Witchblade: The Complete Series — a seven-disc collectors set including the original made-for-TV movie, all 23 episodes of the series, and special features — was released July 29, 2008.

Reboot
In January 2017, NBC announced that it would be developing a Witchblade television series, with Carol Mendelsohn and Caroline Dries serving as executive producers.

Film adaptation
An American superhero film based on the series was announced in 2008. The film was to be directed by Michael Rymer, who directed the 2002 film Queen of the Damned and several episodes of Battlestar Galactica, and was to be written by Everett De Roche.

The film was one of the two being produced and financed back-to-back by Platinum Studios, IDG Films and Relativity Media. The film was to be produced by Arclight's Gary Hamilton and Nigel Odell, Platinum Studios' Scott Mitchell Rosenberg, and Steve Squillante of Havenwood Media. Top Cow's Marc Silvestri and Matt Hawkins were to be executive producers with Platinum Studios' Rich Marincic and Greenberg Group's Randy Greenberg. Filming was announced to begin in September 2008, with China and Australia among the possible locations being considered for filming. Megan Fox was approached for the role of Sara Pezzini at the 2008 San Diego Comic-Con.

The film's website and teaser poster were released in May 2008, but the project was later cancelled.

Anime series

In 2004 Japanese animation studio GONZO announced an anime version of Witchblade'', with a subsequent manga adaptation. The anime version is considered controversial by some, because GONZO has announced that the main character of the anime is of Japanese ethnicity but is not Itagaki, one of the previous bearers of the Witchblade. Instead it is a new character named Masane. Although this series sets up an entire new story with all new characters, it is set in the same continuity as the comic book.

The anime series began broadcast during April 2006 and ran for 24 episodes. The lead character is the kind-hearted Masane who, despite her good intentions, is fairly clumsy and not good around the house. After an earthquake that struck her home six years before the series, known as "Year Zero," Masane has no recollection of her past prior to this date. When she comes into contact with the Witchblade, Masane finds herself under the watchful eye of an organization called the NSWF (National Scientific Welfare Foundation), and struggles to hold on to her daughter Rihoko, whom the government is trying to take away from her.

See also
 Angoulême International Comics Festival
 Comic-Con International
 Graphic novel
 Semic Comics

References

External links

Image Comics – Image Comics Official Site
Arrant, Chris (June 24, 2008). "Top Cow: Then and Now 1: Q&A with President Matt Hawkins". Newsarama. 
Arrant, Chris (June 25, 2008). "Top Cow: Then and Now 2: Q&A with Publisher Filip Sablik". Newsarama. 

Furey, Emmett (December 1, 2008). "WEEK OF TOP COW: Marc Silvestri". Comic Book Resources. 
Furey, Emmett (December 2, 2008). "WEEK OF TOP COW: Filip Sablik". Comic Book Resources.
Weiland, Jonah (December 3, 2008). "WEEK OF TOP COW: Ron Marz & Phil Hester". Comic Book Resources. December 3, 2008
Furey, Emmett (December 5, 2008). "WEEK OF TOP COW: Matt Hawkins". Comic Book Resources.
Furey, Emmett (December 8, 2008). "WEEK OF TOP COW: Rob Levin". Comic Book Resources.
Furey, Emmett (December 8, 2008). "The Future of Top Cow with Filip Sablik". Comic Book Resources.
"Interview with Top Cow Productions Publisher, Filip Sablik". Flames Rising. May 1, 2010

 
1992 establishments in California
Comic book publishing companies of the United States
Companies based in Los Angeles
Publishing companies established in 1992
Book publishing companies based in California